Financial Hi-Tech Zone Station  is a metro station on Guangfo Line (FMetro Line 1) of the Guangzhou Metro.  It is located under the Guangdong Financial High Tech Service Zone, in Haiba Road in the Guicheng Subdistrict of the Nanhai District, Foshan. It was completed on 3 November 2010.

Station layout

Exits

References

Foshan Metro stations
Nanhai District
Railway stations in China opened in 2010
Guangzhou Metro stations